Oncideres nicea is a species of beetle in the family Cerambycidae. It was described by Dillon and Dillon in 1949. It is known from Peru.

References

nicea
Beetles described in 1949